Orcasitas is a ward (barrio) of Madrid belonging to the district of Usera.

See also

Wards of Madrid
Usera